Pat Choate (born April 27, 1941) is an American economist who is most known for being the 1996 Reform Party candidate for Vice President of the United States, the running-mate of Ross Perot. Following the 1996 election, the Federal Election Commission certified the Reform Party as a national political party eligible for federal campaign matching funds, a historic first.

Life and career
Choate was born in Maypearl, Texas, the son of Bettie Lee (Simpson) and Frank William Choate. He is the director of the Manufacturing Policy Project, which studies long-term U.S. economic policy.  He previously worked as Director of Research and Planning for the Oklahoma Industrial Development Commission; as Tennessee's first Commissioner of Economic and Community Development; as the Director of the Appalachian and then Southern Regional Offices of the U.S. Department of Commerce's Economic Development Administration (EDA); as Director of the EDA Office of Economic Research; as the Senior Economist in the Office of Management and Budget's Trade Reorganization Project; as a Fellow at the Battelle Institute's Academy for Contemporary Problems and as Vice President of Public Policy at TRW, Inc.  He has served on several Presidential and Congressional commissions on education, infrastructure and national security.

He was a co-founder of the Congressional Economic Leadership Institute (CELI) in 1986 and served as its Chair or Co-Chair for 18 years.  Choate is married to Kay Casey and has one grown stepson. Pat Choate and his wife live near Washington, Virginia.  He has a BA from the University of Texas at Arlington and an MA and PhD from the University of Oklahoma, all in economics.  In 1994, the University of Oklahoma named him the Arthur Barto Adams Alumni Fellow in recognition of his continuing scholarship. He has taught a course called Advanced Issues Management at George Washington University's Graduate School of Political Management. He is known for work on development economics, including infrastructure and intellectual property, and his strong stance against unfettered globalism. He is also on the Board of Directors for the American Innovators for Patent Reform.

He hosted a weekly radio show called The Week Ahead from 1994 to 1996 and the Pat Choate Show from 1997 to 2000.

Electoral history
1996 United States presidential election
Bill Clinton/Al Gore (Democratic) (Inc.) – 47,402,357 (49.2%) and 379 electoral votes (31 states and D.C. carried)
Bob Dole/Jack Kemp (Republican) - 39,198,755 (40.7%) and 159 electoral votes (19 states carried)
Ross Perot/Pat Choate' (Reform) - 8,085,402 (8.4%) and 0 electoral votes

Bibliography
He has authored and co-authored dozens of reports and several books, including:

 

 Agents of Influence 
 The High Flex Society with Juyne Linger
 America in Ruins with Susan Walters
 Thinking Strategically with Susan Walters
 Being Number One: Rebuilding the U.S. Economy with Gail Garfield Schwartz
 Save Your Job, Save Our Country: Why NAFTA Must Be Stopped Now with Ross Perot
 Hot Property: The Stealing of Ideas in an Age of Globalization 
 Dangerous Business:  The Risks of Globalization to America (Alfred A. Knopf, Inc. August 2008)
 Saving Capitalism: Keeping America Strong''

References

External links
 CNN's All Politics Profile of Dr. Choate
 

 

1941 births
20th-century American politicians
20th-century American non-fiction writers
21st-century American non-fiction writers
American television talk show hosts
George Washington University faculty
Living people
People from Ellis County, Texas
Reform Party of the United States of America vice presidential nominees
1996 United States vice-presidential candidates
University of Oklahoma alumni
University of Texas at Arlington alumni
Economists from Texas
21st-century American economists
Candidates in the 1996 United States presidential election